Pakistan–Saudi Arabia relations, or Pakistani-Saudi Arabian relations, refers to the bilateral relations between Pakistan and Saudi Arabia. Relations have been historically close and friendly, frequently described by analysts as constituting a special relationship. Despite Pakistan's growing relationship with Iran (see Iran-Saudi Arabia proxy conflict) and Saudi Arabia's growing relationship with India (see Indo-Pakistani wars and conflicts), Pakistan has sometimes been dubbed as "Saudi Arabia's closest Muslim ally." Pakistan has, in line with its pan-Islamic ideology, assumed the role of a guardian of Saudi Arabia against any external or internal threat.

History 
Saudi Arabia and Pakistan have sought to develop extensive commercial, cultural, religious, political, and strategic relations since the establishment of Pakistan in 1947. Pakistan affirms its relationship with Saudi Arabia as their most "important and bilateral partnership" in the current foreign policy of Pakistan, working and seeking to develop closer bilateral ties with Saudi Arabia, the largest country on the Arabian peninsula and host to the two holiest cities of Islam, Mecca and Medina and the destination of Muslim pilgrims from across the world.

According to a Pew Research Center survey, Pakistanis hold the most favourable perception of Saudi Arabians in the world, with 9 of 10 respondents viewing Saudi Arabia favorably.  The kingdom has often tried to further enhance its relations with Pakistan by giving it gifts and loans. Often these are gifts with symbolic religious value. For example, in 2014 Saudi Arabia gave Pakistan 200 tonnes of dates as a gesture of friendship.

On 2 April 2014, Pakistan Today reported that Pakistan would sell JF-17 Thunder jets to Saudi Arabia, after the kingdom gave a grant of $1.5 billion to Pakistan in early 2014.

Political relations 

Saudi Arabia and Pakistan are leading members of the Organisation of Islamic Cooperation (OIC). Saudi Arabia is one of the strongest supporters of Pakistan during Pakistan's wars with India, especially in the creation of Bangladesh from Pakistan's eastern wing in 1971.

With Pakistan, it provided extensive financial and political support to the Taliban and the Afghan mujahideen fighting in the Soviet–Afghan War in the 1980s. During the 1990–1991 Persian Gulf War, Pakistan sent troops to protect the Islamic holy sites in Saudi Arabia, but strains developed when some Pakistani politicians and Gen. Mirza Aslam Beg, the then-chief of staff of the Pakistani army openly expressed support for Saddam Hussein's regime in Iraq and its invasion of Kuwait. Along with the United Arab Emirates, Saudi Arabia and Pakistan were the only states to recognise Taliban rule in Afghanistan. In May 1998, Saudi Arabia was the only country that was taken in complete confidence by Prime minister Nawaz Sharif on Pakistan's decision on performing atomic test in weapon-testing laboratories-III (WTL-III) in the region of the Chagai Hills. After he ordered the atomic tests (see codenames: Chagai-I and Chagai-II), Saudi Arabia, along with United Arab Emirates, were the only countries who backed Pakistan and congratulated the country for making the "bold decision". Furthermore, Saudi Arabia promised to supply 50,000 barrels per day of free oil to help Pakistan cope with likely economic sanctions in the aftermath

Economic Relation 
Saudi Arabia is the largest source of petroleum for Pakistan. It also supplies extensive financial aid to Pakistan and remittance from Pakistani migrants in Saudi Arabia is also a major source of foreign currency for Pakistan. In recent years, both countries have exchanged high-level delegations and developed plans to expand bilateral cooperation in trade, education, real estate, tourism, information technology, communications and agriculture. Saudi Arabia is aiding the development of trade relations with Pakistan through the Gulf Cooperation Council, with which Pakistan is negotiating a free trade agreement; the volume of trade between Pakistan and GCC member states in 2006 stood at US$11 billion. Financial co-operation includes $3 billion in aid and loans, of which $1.5 billion was deposited in Pakistan's central bank.

In 2018 Saudi Arabia agreed to establish an oil refinery at Gwadar, with a proposed capacity of 500,000 barrels per day. In 2019, Saudi Arabia paid $20 billion to finance developmental projects in Pakistan. However, Saudi Arabia had to end the loan and oil supply deal including forcing Pakistan to repay $1 billion loan, amidst the latter's criticism that the Saudi Arabia led Organisation of Islamic Cooperation (OIC) was not doing enough to pressure India on the Kashmir issue.

During Pakistan's economic crisis, Saudi Arabia demanded that Pakistan carry out sweeping economic reforms first to realize the IMF's package, otherwise it would not provide assistance as before.

Expat Pakistani Labour
Pakistan has one of the highest numbers of human capital sent over to the Kingdom of Saudi Arabia. Saudi Arabia provides the Islamic Republic of Pakistan economic aid and investments, and there are around two million Pakistani workers in Saudi Arabia, making the Kingdom of Saudi Arabia's second largest migrant community. The Pakistani diaspora living in Saudi Arabia send back remittances of 5.8 billion dollars back to Pakistan. However, many are poor labourers who are exploited by recruiters and agencies, and some are forced,  coerced, or duped into drug smuggling. Leading to Saudi Arabia having some of the largest number of Pakistanis in their jail, which lead to Prime Minister Imran Khan bring up the issue with the Saudis. However, Pakistani officials rarely visit these prisons, unlike officials from other countries. Though Saudi Arabia and Pakistan share friendly relations, the Saudi government showed apathy towards the treatment of Pakistani migrants. The Saudi government violated the Vienna Convention on Consular Relations, since they are supposed to inform Pakistani officials when they arrest Pakistani citizens. Also, Pakistani relatives have little contact with the arrested Pakistani prisoners or retrieve the bodies after execution. Pakistanis face poor treatment from their supervisors, which results in grievance for diaspora population, with some lamenting it starts right from the airport.

Energy Relation

Petroleum 
In February 2019, Saudi Arabia's Saudi Aramco and SABIC announced to set up a US$10 billion oil refinery and Petrochemical industry in Pakistan's deepwater port of Gwadar, Balochistan. It would also help refine and store imported oil for onward transportation to China and develop fuel supply chain for the landlocked Central Asian states. Fuel transportation to China through Pakistan would take just 7 days as opposed to the western route through Indian Ocean that takes almost 40 days.

Mining 
Saudi Arabia is thought to possibly invest in Reko Diq Mine. It is a large copper mine located in the west of Pakistan in Balochistan. Reko Diq represents one of the largest copper reserve in Pakistan and in the world having estimated reserves of 5.9 billion tonnes of ore grading 0.41% copper. The mine also has gold mining reserves amounting to 41.5 million oz.

Security relations 
Pakistan maintains close military ties with Saudi Arabia, providing extensive support, arms and training for the Saudi armed forces. Since the 1970s, Pakistani soldiers have been stationed in Saudi Arabia to protect the Kingdom. Pakistan has also been providing training to Saudi soldiers and pilots. Fighter Pilots of the Pakistan Air Force flew aircraft of the Royal Saudi Air Force to repel an incursion from South Yemen in 1969 and Pakistan Army Corps of Engineers built Saudi fortifications along its border with Yemen.

In the 1970s and 1980s, during the Iran–Iraq War approximately ~20,000 Pakistani soldiers were stationed in the kingdom. Saudi Arabia has negotiated the purchase of Pakistani ballistic missiles capable of carrying nuclear warheads. It is also speculated that Saudi Arabia secretly funded Pakistan's atomic bomb programme and seeks to purchase atomic weapons from Pakistan to enable it to counteract possible threats from arsenals of the weapons of mass destruction possessed by Iran, Iraq and Israel. Both nations have received high-level delegations of scientists, government and Saudi military experts of seeking to study the development of a Saudi nuclear programme. Pakistan also formed a key intermediary in the Al-Yamamah arms deal with the United Kingdom.

According to Bruno Tertrais, a researcher for the EU Non-Proliferation Consortium, during informal discussions held in 2005 a former Pakistan National Command Authority officials have said that deploying Pakistan nuclear warheads in Saudi Arabia would be "worse than the Cuban missile crisis." Tertrais concludes that there is no hard evidence in the public domain of any nuclear cooperation between the two countries.

Pakistan rejected a request from Saudi Arabia to contribute troops to the Saudi-led intervention in Yemen.

Pakistani troops in Saudi Arabia 
Between 1982 and 1987, Pakistan stationed approximately 20,000 servicemen in Saudi Arabia to defend Islamic holy sites. There are reportedly approximately 70,000 Pakistani servicemen serving in the Military of Saudi Arabia.

In February 2018, Pakistan announced that it would be sending troops to Saudi Arabia on a "training and advise mission".

Military Procurement 
Saudi Arabia is the largest importer of Pakistani arms, and has purchased small and medium conventional weaponry worth millions of US Dollars. In 2016, Pakistan Ordnance Factories (POF) has secured export order worth US$81 million to Saudi Arabia.

Cultural relations 

Saudi Arabia has also provided extensive religious and educational aid to Pakistan, being a major contributor to the construction of mosques and madrassas (religious schools) across Pakistan, including the Faisal Mosque in Islamabad, named after King Faisal of Saudi Arabia. Since 1980, the number of religious schools increased from 800 to 27000 in 1997 and all are funded by Saudi Arabia. The schools serve as nurseries for teenagers and younger children (giving religious and moral education) from Pakistan, Syria, Afghanistan, Iran, Russia, Yemen etc.

Since 1947, the political parties have been receiving funding for their political activities in the country. The major Pakistani city of Lyallpur was also renamed Faisalabad in honour of King Faisal in 1977. Saudi Arabia remains a major destination for immigration amongst Pakistanis, the number of whom living in Saudi Arabia stands between 900,000 and 1 million (see Pakistanis in Saudi Arabia). Saudi Arabia was a major supporter of the "Islamisation" programme of the military ruler Gen. Zia-ul-Haq in the 1970s. In 2006, King Abdullah of Saudi Arabia was awarded the Nishan-e-Pakistan, the highest civilian decoration of Pakistan.

2019 Saudi visit to Pakistan 
The Saudi Crown Prince, Muhammad bin Salman, visited Pakistan in February, 2019. Pakistan was the first stop of the Crown Prince's journey to Pakistan and China. While there, the Crown Prince received a gold-plated submachine gun from members of the Pakistani Senate. The most important part of the visit was to sign an agreement to establish a $10 billion refinery and petrochemicals complex in Gwadar.

2022 Pakistani visit to Saudi Arabia

See also 
 Foreign relations of Pakistan
 Foreign relations of Saudi Arabia
 Iran–Saudi Arabia proxy conflict

References 

 
Bilateral relations of Saudi Arabia
Saudi Arabia